The Mansfield Hawks were an International Basketball Association (IBA) professional basketball team that existed for one season in 1998-99.  The Hawks won the IBA championship in their lone season of existence.  They were guided by local, but infamous, coach Kevin Mackey.  One of the Hawks' notable players was 7 ft 2 in, 315 pound center Garth Joseph, a dominating presence with a physical appearance resembling Shaquille O'Neal.  The team played its home games in the gymnasium of Malabar Middle School in Mansfield, Ohio.

In 2005, Mansfield was again targeted as the home for another possible professional basketball team .

All-time roster
This list is incomplete
Tommy Adams 
Dubrey Black - Bowling Green, Ashland University
Samuel Haley - University of Missouri
Donnell Harrison
Matt Hill - University of Wisconsin
Kris Hunter - University of Virginia, Jacksonville University
Garth Joseph - St. Rose
Darren Little
Charles Macon - Ohio State University, Central Michigan 
Curtis McCants
Matt McClelland - Saint Francis  University
Gaylon Nickerson - Northwestern Oklahoma State
Roheen Oats
Reggie Okasa - LaSalle University
Dapreis Owens - University of Nebraska-Lincoln 
Malcolm Sims - Cleveland State University  
Corey Tarrant 
Anthony Taylor - Miami (OH) University
Bevin Thomas
Vincent Thomas - University of Wisconsin Superior
Art Crowder - Howard University
Seth Marshall (basketball)-Freso State University
  Mike Lloyd- Syracuse University
  LaMarr Greer - Florida State University
  Shane Drisdom
  John Tripoulas - Oberlin College
  John Wassenberger
  Artemus McClary

References

External links
Team history
Mission
Coaches
Roster

Defunct basketball teams in the United States
Mansfield, Ohio